CV10 or variation, may refer to:

 , a U.S. Navy Essex-class aircraft carrier
 Autovía CV-10 (motorway CV-10), a Spanish highway in Valencia
 CV10 postcode (UK); see CV postcode area
 Toyota Camry CV10

See also

 CVX (disambiguation)
 CV (disambiguation)